The 218th Field Artillery Regiment is a Field Artillery Regiment of the United States Army, Oregon Army National Guard.  With lineage tracing back to 1866, it is the oldest National Guard artillery unit west of the Mississippi River continually serving.  Today, its 2nd Battalion (2-218th Field Artillery) is a part of the 41st Infantry Brigade Combat Team and is currently headquartered in Forest Grove, Oregon.

Current structure
 2nd Battalion, 218th Field Artillery Regiment 
Headquarters and Headquarters Battery Forest Grove
Battery A, Portland
Battery B, McMinnville
Battery C, Portland
Battery D, Salem
F Forward Support Company, 141st Brigade Support Battalion, Forest Grove
Detachment 2, Las Cruces

Early history
The 218th Field Artillery Regiment traces its lineage to the Portland Light Battery, a militia unit founded by Portland volunteers in 1866, immediately after the American Civil War.  However, the status of militia units declined as the citizens didn't consider a well-armed and disciplined reserve force necessary anymore.  By 1872, the Portland Light Battery and three infantry companies were all that remained of the Oregon militia.  During the Bannock War in 1878, the battery was mobilized to defend northeastern Oregon, but it never saw action and the Indians surrendered by September of that year.  The Bannock War did, however, convince Oregonians of the need of skilled reserve forces, and new units were formed and the old ones were revamped.  Membership in these militia organizations was more fraternal than military.  For example, the published by-laws of the Portland Light Battery stated that "new members shall be voted upon by the membership and if three nay votes are counted, the man will not be accepted."  Dues of fifty cents per month were charged to enable a member to buy his own equipment.  Centralized control and military standardization within the State was nonexistent.

During the late Nineteenth Century, the National Guard underwent serious reorganization and expansion.  In 1916, Battery A of the artillery was sent to the Mexico–United States border for federal service defending against cross-border raids by Pancho Villa.  While the unit did not see combat, it underwent valuable training.  In 1917, The Oregon Field Artillery helped form the 147th Field Artillery Regiment.  The 147th served with the 32nd Infantry Division during World War I.  The 218th claims heritage from the 147th, thus the symbol of the 32nd Division is on its coat of arms.  In 1921, the Ninth Corps Area in the Western U.S. was given the 41st Infantry Division, and Oregon filled the unit's 82nd Brigade with the 162nd Infantry Regiment, the 186th Infantry Regiment, and the newly formed 218th Field Artillery Regiment.

World War II
In 1941, the 218th Field Artillery  was ordered to head to the Philippines to guard against possible Japanese attack.  When the Attack on Pearl Harbor occurred, the 218th was at sea, and was immediately rerouted back to Oregon.  America had entered World War II, and the 41st Infantry Division was sent to the Pacific War to fight against the Empire of Japan.  In the summer of 1943, the 162nd Infantry Regiment alongside a Brigade of Australian troops assaulted Nassau Bay on the north coast of New Guinea in order to drive the Japanese out of Salamaua.  The landings were disastrous, and heavy surf swamped may landing craft.  The infantry struggled to get ashore, and the invasion was soon called "shipwreck landing."  The 218th Field Artillery Battalion was slated to follow the 162nd Infantry in, but not enough boats were available anymore, so B and C Batteries landed several days later.  Japanese snipers, booby traps, and jungle ambushes greeted the artillerymen starting the first day, and the constant rain broken by periods of intense steamy heat marked a difficult campaign ahead.  The 80 men of C Battery hauled their 4 M116 howitzers through 5 miles of jungle by hand, and were forced to cross and recross rivers in the twisting terrain.  Despite the difficulties of moving howitzers through the jungle, the men were dug in on 8 July 1943, six thousand yards from a Japanese controlled hill called, "the Pimple."

On 8 July, the men of C Battery gathered to sign their names on the first shell to be fired by the 218th in combat in World War II.  For several days, the 218th shelled the Pimple and its Japanese defenders in support of the US and Australian infantry assaults.  The men were forced to hand carry the heavy shells hundreds of yards from the beach in order to resupply the howitzers.  Some ammunition was air-dropped but most rounds were destroyed or damaged on impact.  The 218th's NCOs organized working parties to sift through the damaged shells and salvage what primers and projectiles they could from the dented casings.  On 10 July, C Battery fired in support of Australian assault and managed to destroy an entire Japanese company with nine high-explosive shells fired in thirty-six seconds.  The enemy company had stopped for a rest while marching, and made a perfect target for the 75mm howitzers; at least 50 were killed and many more were wounded.  The Australians took the Pimple the next day.

As the New Guinea Campaign continued, the 218th Field Artillery supported infantry assaults on countless ridges and enemy strongpoints.  On 4 August, the unit suffered its first combat fatalities when an Australian mortar round fell short and killed a forward observer team of five men.  On 1 September, as the Battle of Salamaua was nearing its conclusion, the Japanese counterattacked.  Dawn Company, 15th Brigade, Australian Army was cut off on a steep jungle ridge, and was low on ammunition.  Captain Burelbach, the 218th's FSO (Fire Support Officer) attached to Dawn Company expertly called for fire on the attackers, and all the 218th's guns opened fire, driving the Japanese back, and rescuing Dawn Company.  Japanese Marines took up the assault the next day, and the beleaguered Australians seemed on the verge of collapse.  CPT Burelbah again called for the 218th to support, and the Japanese were once again thrown back.  Later in the day, Dawn Company's CO, Captain Provan, hobbled into the 218th perimeter to thank the Oregon artillerymen who saved the lives of his men.

The 218th would go on to serve in the Philippines Campaign from 1944–1945, and returned home when the war ended.  The 41st Infantry Division was deactivated in 1946.

War on Terror
The Second Battalion of the Regiment continues to exist as a part of the 41st Infantry Brigade Combat Team.  During the Global War on Terror, the role of the artillery somewhat changed, and the 2-218th has been called upon to serve in multiple duties other than conventional artillery.  Several volunteers from the Battalion agreed to serve in infantry companies during the Iraq War (OIF II), including Forward Observer Patrick Eldred.  Serving with B Co, 2-162 Infantry, Eldred called for close artillery and air support over the course of 16 days of desperate fighting during the Battle of Najaf in 2004.

The 2-218th Field Artillery was again called to serve in Iraq from July 2009-April 2010.  They served as a route security force and escorted more than 13,000 trucks in hostile environments as US forces began withdrawing from Iraq.  For their service in a role not usually suited for an artillery unit, the battalion earned the Meritorious Unit Commendation.

References

Forest Grove, Oregon
Military units and formations in Oregon
Field artillery regiments of the United States Army
Field artillery regiments of the United States Army National Guard
Military units and formations established in 1866